Arindom Chatterjee, also known by the mononym Arindom, is an Indian music director, singer, and composer noted for his compositions in commercial Bengali movies. His 2012 debut movie, Bojhena Shey Bojhena, fetched him the Best Debutant Composer and Best Album of the Year Award. In addition to movies, Arindom has composed title tracks and music for scores of Bengali television serials like "Thik Jeno Love Story."

In May 2014, Arindom composed the official theme song of "Atletico De Kolkata" for the Indian Super League, Fatafati Football. In August 2019, East Bengal Football Club approached Arindom to compose their Centenary Anthem, the result of which is "Eksho Bochor Dhore," sung by Arijit Singh.

In 2020 the Arts Council of England endorsed Arindom as an exceptional Global Talent, an accolade conferred on individuals with outstanding prospects for contribution in their respective fields.

Career

Arindom debut compositions were in the television serials Nayika and Josh, both televised in Sananda TV in 2011.  His launch as a music composer in movies came through Bojhena Shey Bojhena. The album of Bojhena Shey Bojhena won the Mirchi Music Awards best album of the year in 2013. Since then, Arindom has composed for a number of cinematic projects. Dhaka Attack (2017) is an example of musical collaboration between India and Bangladesh through movies. Arindom worked with the Bangladeshi singer Minar Rahman for the song ‘Eka Din’ from the movie Fidaa (2018). In 2018, he composed the song 'Bhutu Bhaijaan' for the children's movie Haami.

Arindom has worked with Bollywood singers like Vishal Dadlani and Raftaar for the title track of the Tollywood film One (2017). The same year, he composed 'Mithe Alo' for the Bengali movie Cockpit. Arindom's second film, Borbaad, released in 2014 including 'Parbona', sung by Arijit Singh and 'Borbad Hoyechi Ami'. After the success of ‘Parbona’, the composer and singer duo of Arindom and Arijit Singh has delivered songs like 'Egiye De', 'Thik Emon Ebhabe', 'Jodi Bolo', 'Tomar Dyakha Nai', and 'Bhalobasa Jak'. In 2020, Arindom's composed 'Shuney Ne' from the movie Love Aaj Kal Porshu (2020).  He has also contributed songs 'Hotey Parey Na' for Bolo Dugga Maiki (2017), 'Bhalobeshey Kono Bhul' for Bindaas (2014), and 'Bol Na Re Mon' for Gangster (2016).

Bengali discography

Awards

Won ‘Best Album of the Year’ award at the Mirchi Music Awards for the film Bojhena Shey Bojhena in 2013
Nominated for the ‘Best Upcoming Music Director’ award at the Mirchi Music Awards in 2013
Won the ‘Popular Choice Best Album’ award for the film Gangster at the Mirchi Music Awards in 2017
Won the ‘Popular Choice: Best Song’ award for ‘Thik Emon Ebhabe’ from the movie Gangster at the Mirchi Music Awards in 2017
Nominated for the ‘Best Album’ award for the movie Generation Ami at the West Bengal Film Journalists’ Association in 2019

References

External links
 
 

Living people
Bengali musicians
Indian male musicians
Indian film score composers
Indian male film score composers
Year of birth missing (living people)
Musicians from Kolkata